Tmesisternus dubius is a species of beetle in the family Cerambycidae. It was described by Xavier Montrouzier in 1855.

Subspecies
 Tmesisternus dubius rufithorax Breuning, 1956
 Tmesisternus dubius dubius Montrouzier, 1855
 Tmesisternus dubius saintaignani Breuning, 1982

References

dubius
Beetles described in 1855